Marquand may refer to:

Surnames
 Allan Marquand (1853–1924), American art historian
 Christian Marquand (1927–2000), French director, actor and screenwriter
 David Marquand (born 1934), English politician
 Henry Gurdon Marquand (1819–1902), American philanthropist and collector
 Hilary Marquand (1901–1972), British politician
 James Marquand (born 1964), Welsh film editor and director
 John P. Marquand (1893–1960), American novelist
 Richard Marquand (1938–1987), Welsh film director
 Ross Marquand (born 1981), American actor
 Tom Marquand (born 1998), British jockey

Given names
 Marquand Manuel (born 1979), American football player

Placenames
 Marquand, Missouri, United States

See also
 Marquard (disambiguation)